The Hitchhiker's Guide to the Galaxy is a BBC television adaptation of Douglas Adams's The Hitchhiker's Guide to the Galaxy which was broadcast in January and February 1981 on UK television station BBC Two. The adaptation follows the original radio series in 1978 and 1980, the first novel and double LP, in 1979, and the stage shows, in 1979 and 1980, making it the fifth iteration of the guide.

The series stars Simon Jones as Arthur Dent, David Dixon as Ford Prefect, Mark Wing-Davey as Zaphod Beeblebrox, Sandra Dickinson as Trillian and Stephen Moore as the voice of Marvin. The voice of the guide is by Peter Jones. Simon Jones, Peter Jones, Stephen Moore and Mark Wing-Davey had already provided the voices for their characters in the original radio series in 1978/80. In addition, the series features a number of notable cameo roles, including Adams himself on several occasions.

Although initially thought by BBC executives to be unfilmable, the series was successfully produced and directed by Alan J. W. Bell and went on to win a Royal Television Society Award as Most Original Programme of 1981, as well as several British Academy Television Awards for its graphics and editing.

Development and production 
After the success of the first seven episodes of the radio series, all broadcast in 1978, and while the second radio series was being recorded, Douglas Adams was commissioned to deliver a pilot script for a television adaptation on 29 May 1979, to be delivered by 1 August. A fully animated version was briefly discussed in the autumn of 1978, but it was eventually decided to make most of the series feature "live action" and only animate The Guides entries. John Lloyd, who had worked with Adams on the first radio series, is credited with starting the process of adapting the series for television, after the receipt of the pilot script, with a memo to the head of light entertainment (John Howard Davies) in September 1979. Adams was still working on scripts for the second radio series of Hitchhiker's and working as script editor for Doctor Who, and thus the BBC extended the deadline for the pilot script of the television adaptation to the end of November. The script for the pilot was delivered in December 1979, and terms for the five remaining scripts were agreed upon in January 1980. While there was some resistance to a project considered "unfilmable," Alan J. W. Bell was given the duties to produce and direct the TV adaptation. John Lloyd was signed as associate producer.

In early 1980, production on the pilot episode began on several fronts.  Rod Lord of Pearce Animation Studios directed a 50-second pilot, hand-animated, giving a 'computer graphic' feel to the Babel Fish speech of the first episode. Douglas Adams and Alan J.W. Bell were both pleased with the animation, and Lord was given the go-ahead to do all of the animation for episode one, and subsequently the complete TV series. Narration for the first episode was recorded by Peter Jones in March 1980. The filming of two green-skinned aliens reacting to Pan Galactic Gargle Blasters was done on 8 May 1980. Further filming of crowd reactions to the Vogons, location filming of Arthur's house and a scene in a pub were done between 11 and 16 May 1980. Scenes aboard the Vogon ship were recorded on 7 June 1980, in the BBC's TC1 studio. The final edit of the pilot episode was completed on 2 July 1980, and it was premiered for a test audience three days later (5 July 1980). Further test screenings were held in August 1980. Based on successful test screenings, the cast was reassembled to complete the six episodes of the series in September 1980. Production continued through the autumn, with filming and recording occurring out of order. Recording and production of the final episode continued into January 1981.

The gap in production made for some continuity problems between the pilot episode and the remainder. Notably, Simon Jones's hair was cut short for another role and he wears a noticeable hairpiece in later episodes. Conversely, David Dixon's hair appears longer.

One major change first appeared in the stage show and LP adaptations, and made its way into the novels and TV adaptation. Nearly all of the sequences from episodes five and six in the first radio series that were originally co-written with John Lloyd were completely cut. Thus the Hotblack Desiato character and Disaster Area make appearances in TV episode five, and Ford, Arthur, Zaphod and Trillian are all randomly teleported off of Disaster Area's stunt ship in TV episode six. Lloyd does receive a co-writer's credit on episode five, for the material on the statistics about the universe.

The complexities of adapting the material for television meant that some episodes became as long as 35 minutes; as a result, material that had appeared in the radio series (e.g.: the seance involving Zaphod's ancestors) had to be cut. The programme is particularly notable for its mock computer animation sequences, actually produced on film using traditional cel animation techniques.

There have been several different edits of the series: Some, but not all, American PBS stations recut the series into seven 30-minute episodes when they began transmitting the episodes nearly two years later, in December 1982. Other PBS stations re-edited the programme into TV movies, broadcasting more than one episode at a time without interruption. The UK videotape release was on two cassettes, each consisting of three episodes edited to run together and also adding some previously unseen material. The soundtrack was remixed into stereo. The North American VHS tape released by CBS/Fox Video included this material on a single video cassette. The DVD edition claims to be the final and definitive version of the six TV episodes.

Another production problem was that, being a visual adaptation, a solution had to be found to display Zaphod's three arms and two heads, a joke originally written for radio. In a previous stage adaptation, a version of a pantomime horse was used, where two actors filled one costume, providing three arms and two heads between them. For this TV series, a radio-controlled animatronic head was designed and built, incorporating twelve servo motors and two receivers. However, the head was notoriously unreliable and in many scenes merely sits there, inanimate. For the third arm, most of the time it was seen tucked into Zaphod's jacket. But when called for, Mike Kelt, who had designed the extra head (with Joan Stribling; BBC Make-up, Hair, Prosthetics Designer) would hide behind Mark Wing-Davey and slip his arm into the appropriate sleeve.

Other elements to the production were done by a variety of BBC designers. The Heart of Gold and B Ark models were built by Perry Brahan. The small, furry creature from Alpha Centauri in episode three was a puppet designed and controlled by Jim Francis, who also built the Magrathean bubble car (also seen in episode three), and was the stunt double for Richard Vernon in the scene in which the bubble car was seen to fly. Matte paintings throughout the series were created by Jean Peyre. Music and sound effects were by Paddy Kingsland, with the exception of the theme music; the familiar Journey of the Sorcerer theme by Bernie Leadon was used again, in the arrangement by Tim Souster that had previously been used for the Hitchhiker's LP. Video effects using the Quantel system were done by Dave Jervis. Other puppets, including insects seen in episode five, were designed by Susan Moore. Some of the actual puppeteering was done by Stuart Murdoch, including operating parts of the Dish of the Day animal.

Two important cast changes were made for the TV version. David Dixon replaced Geoffrey McGivern as Ford, and Sandra Dickinson replaced Susan Sheridan as Trillian. The changes were made because McGivern did not suit the role visually, and Sheridan was unavailable at the time. Another new cast member was Michael Cule, who appears as the Vogon Guard in episode two. Cule had first appeared in one of the Hitchhiker's stage adaptations, performing no fewer than twelve roles. He reprised the Vogon Guard part in the 1992 Making of the Hitchhiker's Guide to the Galaxy TV documentary, voiced the Babel fish, appeared in the 1994 photo illustrated edition of the book (as Prosser), and returned a third time as a Vogon Guard for the BBC Radio 4 Quandary Phase.

Because of the sheer number of models used in episodes two to six, a single day of filming just the model sequences was set aside at the BBC Television Centre on 28 October 1980. This has been described as "a luxury few other shows could afford."
To provide proper timing of spoken lines on-set, Douglas Adams himself spoke the lines of Eddie the Computer and Deep Thought, until they were redubbed by David Tate and Valentine Dyall respectively. Douglas Adams has several cameo appearances in the TV series:
Episode 1: One of the drinkers in the background of the pub.
Episode 2: The man who walks naked into the ocean, similar to Reginald Perrin. The original actor for the part called in sick.
Episode 2: The Guide entry on "The Worst Poetry" also used Adams's likeness as the basis for the illustration of Paula Nancy Millstone Jennings.
Episode 2: In the future Encyclopedia Galactica, Douglas makes a cameo appearance as one of the Sirius Cybernetic Marketing Division members.
Episode 3: An image in a guide entry on "an important and popular fact", along with animator Rod Lord, who provided a self-portrait.

The hand-animated "computer graphics" of The Hitchhiker's Guide itself won a BAFTA, a Design and Art Direction Silver award, and a London Film Fest award.

The spaceman suspended from a wire in the opening title sequence was Alan Harris.

Locations for filming included a clay pit and the former Par—Fowey railway tunnel in Cornwall, the Edmonds Farm and Red Lion pub in Haywards Heath, Sussex, the Budgemoor Golf & Country Club near Henley-on-Thames, and at Dovestones in the Peak District National Park.
Episode three was originally scripted to have a "pre-credits sequence" where Trillian announces their arrival at "the most improbable planet that ever existed", Magrathea, to Zaphod. This was never filmed. The arrangement of Journey of the Sorcerer by Tim Souster, used in the titles, was released as a single in the UK in January 1981. The B-side featured Douglas Adams playing rhythm guitar.

Many of the costumes seen in episodes one to four can be seen again during sequences at Milliway's in episode five. In episode five the writing at the start showing 42 crossed out several times also includes the number 101010 which is the 42nd number in the binary number base.

 Episode guide 

 Episode 1 First broadcast: 5 January 1981Synopsis: Episode one begins with a pre-credits sequence, the only one of the TV episodes to have one. A countdown to the end of the world is displayed through animation, and the narrator begins telling the story of the Guide and Arthur Dent's connection to it as the sun rises over the English countryside for the final time. Arthur wakes, discovers the threat to his house from a yellow bulldozer by looking out the window, and the camera pulls back to the titles. This episode closely follows the plot and dialogue of the first episode of the radio series, cutting the speech by Lady Cynthia Fitzmelton. It ends at a slightly earlier point than the radio episode, after Ford's line "he might want to read us some of his poetry first", and on a cliffhanger that Arthur and Ford are about to be discovered in a Vogon storeroom, but before the Vogon poetry is actually read.Cast (in order of appearance): The Book (narrator): Peter Jones
 Arthur Dent: Simon Jones
 Mr Prosser: Joe Melia
 Ford Prefect: David Dixon
 Workman One (uncredited): Terry Duran
 Workman Two (uncredited): George Cornelius
 Alien (girl): Cleo Rocos
 Alien (guy): Andrew Mussell
 Man at end of bar (uncredited): Douglas Adams
 Barman: Steve Conway
 Barfly (uncredited): Steve Trainer
 Prostetnic Vogon Jeltz (Vogon Captain) and Vogon Guard (uncredited for the latter): Martin Benson
 Sandwich-board man (uncredited): David Grahame
 Irritated man hitting radio (uncredited): Bill Barnsley

 Episode 2 First broadcast: 12 January 1981Synopsis: The episode opens with a recap of the story, with Ford and Arthur about to be captured. After being read Vogon poetry, they are thrown out of an airlock and improbably rescued by the starship Heart of Gold, which has been stolen by Ford's semi-cousin Zaphod Beeblebrox, accompanied by Trillian, a young woman who Arthur once met at a party. Ford and Arthur are escorted to the bridge by Marvin the Paranoid Android and meet Zaphod and Trillian. The episode ends after they are introduced, with no cliffhanger.Cast (in order of appearance): The Book: Peter Jones
 Unhappy man (uncredited): Douglas Adams
 Arthur Dent: Simon Jones
 Ford Prefect: David Dixon
 Vogon Captain: Martin Benson
 Vogon Guard: Michael Cule
 Trillian: Sandra Dickinson
 Zaphod Beeblebrox: Mark Wing-Davey
 Marvin (costume): David Learner
 Marvin (voice): Stephen Moore
 Young Smartarse (uncredited): Ralph Morse
 Newscaster: Rayner Bourton
 Bikini girl in commercial for Sirius Cybernetics Corporation (uncredited): Jennifer Goble
 Gag Halfrunt: Gil Morris
 Eddie the Computer: David Tate

 Episode 3 First broadcast: 19 January 1981Synopsis: The episode opens with a guide entry explaining the legendary planet of Magrathea, which manufactured planets millions of years ago, until the galactic economy collapsed. Zaphod has been explaining to Ford that he has found the legendary planet of Magrathea, whilst Trillian tends to a pair of white mice. Zaphod orders the computer to land on the planet surface. Before long, they receive a transmission from the commercial council of Magrathea, informing them that the planet is closed for business and asking them to leave. They ignore this and later receive another message, noting that nuclear missiles have been sent at the ship. Attempts to evade the missiles fail, and Arthur uses the ship's infinite improbability drive, which ends up turning the missiles into a very surprised looking whale and a bowl of petunias. Trillian discovers that during the chaos, her mice escaped. The five characters go onto the surface, where they find it desolate. Zaphod suggests that the Magratheans lived beneath the surface of the planet. They split into two groups – Trillian, Zaphod and Ford explore a tunnel, while Arthur and Marvin remain on the surface. Trillian, Zaphod and Ford's thread ends on a cliffhanger, with them seeing something alarming at the end of the corridor. Meanwhile, Arthur and Marvin watch the sunset. Eventually, Slartibartfast arrives, and asks Arthur to come with him. He explains that the Magratheans were in hibernation for the last five million years. They get into his air-car, and descend deep into a tunnel. A guide narrative intervenes, explaining that while humanity had always assumed that it was the most intelligent species on Earth, in fact the dolphins were more intelligent, and had left the planet some time before. However, both the dolphins and humans were less intelligent than the mice. Meanwhile, Slartibartfast shows Arthur the vast tract of hyperspace that acts as the Magrathean's factory floor, and that they have been brought out of hibernation for a special commission — "the Earth Mk II, we're making a copy from our original blueprints". The Earth was originally made by Magrathea for mice; and it was destroyed five minutes too early. The episode ends here.Cast (in order of appearance): The Book: Peter Jones
 Spaceman (uncredited): John Austen-Gregg
 Spacewoman (uncredited): Zoe Hendry
 Handmaiden One (uncredited): Nicola Critcher
 Handmaiden Two (uncredited): Jacoba
 Handmaiden Three (uncredited): Lorraine Paul
 Handmaiden Four (uncredited): Susie Silvey
 Rich Merchant (uncredited): John Dair
 Ford Prefect: David Dixon
 Zaphod Beeblebrox: Mark Wing-Davey
 Trillian: Sandra Dickinson
 Arthur Dent: Simon Jones
 Eddie the Computer: David Tate
 Holographic Magrathean and Slartibartfast: Richard Vernon
 Marvin the Paranoid Android: David Learner
 Voices of the Whale and Marvin: Stephen Moore

 Episode 4 First broadcast: 26 January 1981Synopsis: Slartibartfast shows Arthur the archive tapes of Deep Thought being given the Search for the Ultimate Answer and of the result reported by the computer seven and a half million years later. After learning that the Earth was set up to search for the Ultimate Question, Slartibartfast and Arthur join Ford, Trillian, Zaphod, and Trillian's mice, who had guided them to Magrathea. The mice dismiss Slartibartfast, then express their desire to determine the Ultimate Question by first extracting Arthur's brain. While the mice attempt to strike a deal, the galactic police arrive, and Ford, Arthur, Trillian and Zaphod flee the dining hall, only to be cornered by the police in a large bay. After a misunderstanding, the police open fire on a computer behind which the four are hiding, causing it to explode and ending the episode on a cliffhanger.Cast (in order of appearance): The Book: Peter Jones
 Arthur Dent: Simon Jones
 Slartibartfast: Richard Vernon
 PA Voice (uncredited): David Tate
 Lunkwill/Loon-Quall (latter uncredited): Antony Carrick
 Fook/Phougg (latter uncredited): Timothy Davies
 Deep Thought: Valentine Dyall
 Guard (uncredited): Richard Reid
 Majikthise: David Leland
 Vroomfondel: Charles McKeown
 Alien Robot (uncredited): Eddie Sommer
 G'Gugvunt Leader (uncredited): Eric French
 Vl'Hurg Leader (uncredited): James Muir
 Trillian: Sandra Dickinson
 Zaphod Beeblebrox: Mark Wing-Davey
 Ford Prefect: David Dixon
 Benjy Mouse: David Tate
 Frankie Mouse: Stephen Moore
 Bang Bang: Marc Smith
 Shooty: Matt Zimmerman

Note: The part of "Loon-Quall," one of the two computer programmers who hears Deep Thought announce "The Answer," is stated by the DVD production notes as being played by David Leland. However, the idea of the role was for that character to have been descended from the earlier programmer, Lunkwill, played by Antony Carrick.

 Episode 5 First broadcast: 2 February 1981Synopsis: After an initial period of confusion, the four travellers find they have been transported forward in time to just before the end of the universe. They are in "Milliways, the Restaurant at the End of the Universe", which was built on the ruins of Magrathea. So, as Arthur says, they have travelled through time but not through space. Waiting for them is Marvin the depressed robot, whom they left on Magrathea 40 million years ago. He's now an attendant at the car park, and still depressed. Just before the universe ends, Zaphod and Ford get Marvin to help them steal a supercool all-black spaceship, which turns out to be the property of a very loud rock band called "Disaster Area". The episode ends on the cliffhanger as the black ship is about to start a dive into the sun of Kakrafoon.Cast (in order of appearance): The Book: Peter Jones
 Arthur Dent: Simon Jones
 Ford Prefect: David Dixon
 Trillian: Sandra Dickinson
 Zaphod Beeblebrox: Mark Wing-Davey
 Garkbit (Head Waiter): Jack May
 Girl on stairs (uncredited): Mary Eveleigh
 Hotblack Desiato: Barry Frank Warren
 Bodyguard: Dave Prowse
 Max Quordlepleen: Colin Jeavons
 Dish of the Day: Peter Davison
 Marvin (costume): David Learner
 Marvin (voice): Stephen Moore
 The Great Prophet Zarquon: Colin Bennett

 Episode 6 First broadcast: 9 February 1981Synopsis: Just before the supercool all-black ship crashes into a sun, Zaphod, Trillian, Ford, and Arthur escape in a teleport module that they convince Marvin to stay behind and operate. He is still on the ship when it heads into the sun. Ford and Arthur arrive - without Zaphod and Trillian - on a spaceship carrying millions of people in cryogenic pods. The ship's inhabitants are from Golgafrincham; they are unskilled workers in apparently pointless jobs, the people that the clever Golgafrinchams, the thinkers and the doers, back home wanted to get rid of. The ship lands on pre-historic Earth. Ford realises that the Golgafrinchams, not the primitive cave dwellers already on the planet, are the ones that will evolve into the human race. The episode ends with the two friends lamenting the eventual destruction of the Earth. The regular theme music follows the song What a Wonderful World by Louis Armstrong.Cast (in order of appearance):'''
 The Book: Peter Jones
 Arthur Dent: Simon Jones
 Ford Prefect: David Dixon
 Trillian: Sandra Dickinson
 Zaphod Beeblebrox: Mark Wing-Davey
 Marvin (costume): David Learner
 Marvin (voice) and Radio voices (latter uncredited): Stephen Moore
 Newscaster: Rayner Bourton
 Number One: Matthew Scurfield
 Number Three: Geoffrey Beevers

 B Ark Captain: Aubrey Morris
 Marketing Girl: Beth Porter
 Hairdresser: David Rowlands
 Management Consultant: Jon Glover
 Number Two: David Neville

 Possibility of second series 
A second series was planned at one point, with a storyline, according to Alan Bell and Mark Wing-Davey, that would have come from Adams' abandoned Doctor Who and the Krikkitmen project (instead of a TV version of the second radio series). However, Adams got into disputes with the BBC (accounts differ: problems with budget, scripts, and having Alan Bell and/or Geoffrey Perkins involved were all offered as causes), and the second series was never made. The elements of the Doctor Who and the Krikketmen project instead became the third novel, Life, the Universe and Everything.

 Documentary 

In 1992, Kevin Davies wrote and directed a documentary entitled The Making of the Hitchhiker's Guide to the Galaxy. Davies had previously worked on the stage show at the Rainbow Theatre, and, while working for Pierce Animation Studios in 1980, had introduced Alan Bell to Rod Lord, leading to the animation for the TV series. For the documentary, Davies used many photographs and home movies he shot during the 1980 production of the series and recorded new interviews in October 1992 with the cast and crew. New footage of Simon Jones, David Dixon and Michael Cule, in character, were shot at the farm in Sussex used as Arthur Dent's house, and incorporated into the documentary with some references to So Long, and Thanks for All the Fish, such as Arthur finding his home intact, and placing his (animated) Babel fish into a goldfish bowl. BBC video released the sixty-minute documentary on VHS in 1993. Footage not included in the original documentary was included in the 2002 DVD release of the series. The documentary itself has not (as of 2005) been transmitted on TV.

 Availability 

Neil Gaiman reveals in the first edition of his biography of Douglas Adams, Don't Panic, that the BBC was preparing a Laserdisc release of the Hitchhiker's TV series in the mid-1980s, but had to cancel the project due to a legal tangle with the movie rights, although master tapes for the Laserdiscs were prepared. The sound was specially remixed in stereo and Elektra/Asylum records agreed to license the original Eagles theme music. The series was eventually released on VHS format by BBC Video in 1992. This was a dual cassette edition featuring additional material that had originally been cut from the broadcast episodes. CBS/Fox Video made the six episodes available on a single VHS tape in North America starting in 1993. They were joined by The Making of the Hitchhiker's Guide to the Galaxy, also on VHS, that same year, as well as a Laserdisc release. A double tape box set edition was also released featuring the collected complete series and Making Of releases. Restoration of the six episodes and the Making Of documentary commenced in 2001, with a Region 2 and 4 DVD release in the United Kingdom by BBC Video (Catalogue Number BBCDVD 1092) in January 2002. A Region 1 edition, released by Warner Home Video, followed in April 2002. Both DVD editions are two-disc sets, with the six episodes on the first disc and accompanying bonus materials on the second. The North American DVD edition also has a copy of the Omnibus tribute to Douglas Adams from BBC Two that aired on 4 August 2001, which the UK DVD edition does not.

A special edition box set of the series was released on Blu-ray and DVD on 1 October 2018. The set featured upscaled HD versions of the original episodes alongside optional stereo or 5.1 surround sound mixes remastered by Mark Ayres, formerly of the BBC Radiophonic Workshop.

In North America, the complete series is viewable on Hulu, Amazon Prime and BritBox. In the UK, the complete series is viewable on BritBox, with the Special Edition available on Amazon Prime Video.

Reception
On Rotten Tomatoes, the show has a 67% approval rating based on 6 reviews.

Awards
 Royal Television Society Awards:
 Best Original Programme
 British Academy Television Awards:
 Best VTR Editor: Ian Williams
 Best Sound Supervisor: Michael McCarthy
 Best Graphics: Rod Lord

 See also 
 1981 in British television
 Towel Day, an annual tribute to Douglas Adams

 References 

 Sources 

 The Hitchhiker's Guide to the Galaxy, VHS, R1 and R2 DVD releases of the TV series. DVD "Onscreen Production Notes" by Kevin Davies.
 Webb, Nick. Wish You Were Here: The Official Biography of Douglas Adams, 1st American edition. Ballantine Books, New York, NY, USA, 2005.

 External links 

The Hitch-Hiker's Guide to the Galaxy at British TV Comedy
BBC Online — Cult — The Hitchhiker's Guide to the Galaxy
Rod Lord, who directed The Guide'''s animated sequences for the TV series has a page about the animations and an essay on how they were done posted here.

1980s British comic science fiction television series
1981 British television series debuts
1981 British television series endings
BBC Television shows
British science fiction television shows
The Hitchhiker's Guide to the Galaxy
Works by Douglas Adams
Space adventure television series
Television series based on radio series
Television series set on fictional planets
British time travel television series
Post-apocalyptic television series
English-language television shows